Thung Hua Chang is a village and tambon (subdistrict) of Thung Hua Chang District, in Lamphun Province, Thailand. In 2005 it had a population of 8294 people. The tambon contains 12 villages.

References

Tambon of Lamphun province
Populated places in Lamphun province